Saxifraga tridactylites, the rue-leaved saxifrage or "nailwort", is a species of plant in the family Saxifragaceae.

Rue-leaved saxifrage is an annual plant with distinctive, trilobed, fleshy leaves and red stems. These stems, the leaves and the sepals are covered in numerous sticky glands.

References

tridactylites
Plants described in 1753
Taxa named by Carl Linnaeus
Flora of Malta